Chahar Mur (also Romanized as Chahār Mūr; also known as Chahār Mor and Ḩājjī Bānī) is a village in Hamaijan Rural District, Hamaijan District, Sepidan County, Fars Province, Iran. At the 2006 census, its population was 197, in 43 families.

References 

Populated places in Sepidan County